A triskelion is a motif consisting of three identical figures emanating from a center.

Triskelion or Triskellion may also refer to:

Art, entertainment, and media
Triskelion (Marvel Cinematic Universe), the headquarters of S.H.I.E.L.D. in the Marvel Cinematic Universe
Triskelionthe fictional ternary starlit world depicted in "The Gamesters of Triskelion" episode of the original Star Trek television series
Triskellion (series)a series of fictional books written by Mark Billingham and Peter Cocks

Organizations
Triskelion Artsa non-profit arts presenting organization which includes two theaters and rehearsal studios in Williamsburg, Brooklyn
Triskelion Grand Fraternitya fraternity established in the Philippines. Its members call themselves Triskelions

See also
Trisquel